"FeelingPulledApartByHorses" and "TheHollowEarth" are songs by Thom Yorke, produced by Nigel Godrich. The songs were self-released as a limited double A-side vinyl in September 2009 and as a download on 6 October 2009.

"FeelingPulledApartByHorses" began as a Radiohead song, and was first performed in 2001. Yorke later performed it with his bands Atoms for Peace and the Smile. "TheHollowEarth" came from the recording sessions for Yorke's album The Eraser (2006).

Writing and recording 
Yorke's band Radiohead performed an early version of "FeelingPulledApartByHorses", then titled "Reckoner", in 2001. Yorke likened it to heavy metal; Pitchfork described it as a "droning rocker", and Rolling Stone wrote that it featured "one of the loudest and most sinister riffs in Radiohead's catalog". In 2005, Yorke performed the song solo on acoustic guitar at a Trade Justice Movement show.

Working on the song for their 2007 album In Rainbows, Radiohead added a coda that developed into a different song with the original title, "Reckoner". Afterwards, Yorke and the Radiohead guitarist Jonny Greenwood reworked the original song to create the final version. They omitted the chorus and added bass guitar, "glitchy" drums, "disembodied" vocals, and an extended synthesiser coda. Rolling Stone described it as "more subdued and textural", in the style of Yorke's 2006 album The Eraser. Yorke described "TheHollowEarth" as a "bass menace" that came from the recording sessions for The Eraser.

Release 
The songs were self-released as a double A-side 12-inch single on 21 September 2009 and as a download on 6 October 2009. The vinyl was limited to 8000 copies worldwide.

Reception 
Pitchfork gave "FeelingPulledApartByHorses" a positive review, writing: "Quartering, in medieval times, meant being pulled apart by horses; Yorke's skillful production here re-imagines that punishment as a disorienting pleasure."

Live performances 
In 2009, Yorke formed a new band, Atoms for Peace, to perform his solo material. They performed "FeelingPulledApartByHorses" on their 2013 tour. Yorke and Greenwood performed "FeelingPulledApartByHorses" with their band the Smile on their 2022 tour. A performance was included on the 2023 Smile EP Europe: Live Recordings 2022.

Track listing

References

External links
DEAD AIR SPACE – Radiohead's blog with Yorke's announcement

2009 songs
2009 singles
Thom Yorke songs
Songs written by Thom Yorke
Songs written by Jonny Greenwood
Song recordings produced by Nigel Godrich
XL Recordings singles